Amphicnephes pullus is a species of signal flies in the family Platystomatidae.

References

Platystomatidae
Insects described in 1830